John William Golemgeske (November 14, 1915 – December 22, 1958) was an American football offensive lineman in the National Football League.   He played four seasons for the Brooklyn Dodgers (1937 to 1940) as a tackle and guard. He played at the collegiate level at the University of Wisconsin–Madison.  Golemgeske died at age 43 on December 22, 1958 in Milwaukee, Wisconsin of a heart attack suffered the day before.

References

1915 births
1958 deaths
American football offensive tackles
Brooklyn Dodgers (NFL) players
Wisconsin Badgers football players
Sportspeople from Waukesha, Wisconsin
Players of American football from Wisconsin
Sportspeople from the Milwaukee metropolitan area